José Domingo Amunátegui Borgoño was a Chilean Brigadier General who participated across many battles of the War of the Pacific as well as a primary commander of the Lima campaign.

Biography
However he was then terminated of his service due to the Chilean Revolution of 1851 and wouldn't return into active service until 1861 where he was assigned to the 4th Line Infantry as a captain.

During the War of the Pacific, Amunátegui participarted in the battles of Pisagua, San Francisco, Tacna, San Juan and Chorrillos and Miraflores. He then founded the Military Circle for the cultural and social training of the military as well as the Director of the Chilean Army War Academy. In 1884, he was promoted to Brigadier General as well as a Inspector General of the Chilean Army.

References

1832 births
1887 deaths
People from Chillán
Chilean military personnel of the War of the Pacific
Chilean Army generals